Waiontha Mountain is a small mountain chain in the Central New York Region of New York. It is made of two main elevations the tallest being . It is located in the Town of Springfield, east of Richfield Springs and north of Allen Lake. Wilders Hill is located northwest and Mohegan Hill is located southwest of Waiontha Mountain.

References

Mountains of Otsego County, New York
Mountains of New York (state)